Home Before Midnight is a 1979 British sexploitation drama film directed and produced by Pete Walker, written by Murray Smith, and starring James Aubrey, Alison Elliott and Richard Todd.

Plot
The film is set in London and follows Mike Beresford, a 28-year-old songwriter who is charged with statutory rape after having sex with a 14 year old girl.

Cast
 James Aubrey - Mike Beresford
 Alison Elliott - Ginny Wilshire
 Mark Burns - Harry Wilshire
 Juliet Harmer - Susan Wilshire
 Richard Todd - Geoffrey Steele
 Debbie Linden - Carol
 Andy Forray - Vince Owen
 Chris Jagger - Nick
 Sharon Maughan - Helen Owen
 Charles Collingwood - Burlingham
 Faith Kent - Miss Heatherton
 John Hewer - Donelly
 Jeff Rawle - Johnnie McGee
 Patrick Barr - Judge
 Edward de Souza - Archer
 Ian Sharrock - Malcolm
 Emma Jacobs - Lindy
 Leonard Kavanagh - Mr. Beresford
 Joan Pendleton - Mrs. Beresford
 Ivor Roberts - Inspector Gray
 Claire McClellan - Tracey Wilshire
 Nicholas Young - Ray

Production

Soundtrack
The soundtrack for the film - excluding incidental music provided by Ray Russell - was written and performed by British band Jigsaw. These songs were later released on a soundtrack album.

References

Bibliography

External links

1979 films
1979 crime drama films
British crime drama films
British courtroom films
Films directed by Pete Walker
Films set in 1978
Films set in London
Juvenile sexuality in films
1970s English-language films
1970s British films